Site As-31-72 is a prehistoric archaeological site on the island of Tutuila in the United States territory of American Samoa. Platforms and other features have been identified during archaeological examination of the structure and its surroundings in the 1990s. Its purpose is unknown; the researchers conjecture it was built because of warfare.

The site was listed on the National Register of Historic Places in 1997.

See also
National Register of Historic Places listings in American Samoa

References

Tutuila
Archaeological sites on the National Register of Historic Places in American Samoa